Nodaway Valley High School is a rural public high school in Greenfield, Iowa, United States. It is part of the Nodaway Valley Community School District.

It serves the towns of Greenfield, Bridgewater, and Fontanelle, and surrounding rural areas.

The school was formed in 1993 from the merger of Bridgewater–Fontanelle High School and Greenfield High School. On July 1, 2000, the school's district, Greenfield Community School District, merged with Bridgewater–Fontanelle to form the Nodaway Valley district.

In 2005, it had 295 students and 26 teachers. 13% were eligible for free lunch, less than the state average of 23%.

Nodaway Valley's mascot of is the wolverine.  School colors are silver, purple, and black.

Athletics 
The Wolverines compete in the Pride of Iowa Conference in the following sports:

 Football
 Volleyball
 Cross Country
 Boys' 2002 Class 1A State Champions
 Girls' 2009 Class 1A State Champions
 Basketball
 Boys' 2006 Class 2A State Champions
 Wrestling
In the 2008–09 season, the wrestling team finished with a 20–0 regular season.
 Bowling
 Golf
 Track and Field
 Baseball
 Softball

See also
List of high schools in Iowa

References

External links 
 Nodaway Valley Community School District
 publicschoolsreview.com

Education in Adair County, Iowa
Public high schools in Iowa
Iowa High School Athletic Association
Educational institutions established in 1993
1993 establishments in Iowa